The Cambridge riot of 1967 was one of 159 race riots that swept cities in the United States during the "Long Hot Summer of 1967".  This riot occurred on July 24, 1967 in Cambridge, Maryland, a county seat on the Eastern Shore. For years racial tension had been high in Cambridge, where black people had been limited to second-class status. Activists had conducted protests since 1961, and there was a riot in June 1963 after the governor imposed martial law. "The Treaty of Cambridge" was negotiated among federal, state, and local leaders in July 1963, initiating integration in the city prior to passage of federal civil rights laws. 

After H. Rap Brown gave a speech on the evening of July 24, black residents began to confront police while trying to have a protest march. Brown was wounded and rushed out of Cambridge by supporters. About an hour later, unrest broke out in the black community. An elementary school was set on fire. Because the fire department did not respond for two hours, the fire spread and destroyed seventeen other buildings on Pine Street, the center of African-American life in the city. Governor Spiro Agnew sought to have Brown charged with inciting a riot. The FBI helped track down the activist, who was arrested within two days.

History of riots 
The Cambridge riot of 1967 was an expression of frustration and anger by black people living in Cambridge, who had been oppressed by state racial laws and custom. This had been a rural area of plantations dependent on the labor of enslaved African Americans. In the mid-20th century, many black people worked in low-level jobs in the growing poultry industry in the rural area, but still suffered low wages and unemployment. Overt racial segregation in schools and public facilities had largely ended after the June 1963 riot and "Treaty of Cambridge," but black people still suffered from economic inequality. 

In 1961, the Freedom Riders came to Cambridge, part of an effort to desegregate seating and facilities for interstate buses. Many participants were students from regional colleges, such as Howard University in Washington, DC. Some also were members of such civil rights organizations as SNCC or CORE. The black community in Cambridge conducted its own activism, led by with sit-ins through 1962 and 1963, protesting segregated facilities. In June 1963 martial law was imposed and the National Guard was ordered into the city. A protest on June 11 resulted in shots being exchanged after whites attacked black protesters marching to the Dorchester County Courthouse before curfew. 

Attorney General Robert F. Kennedy called a meeting in Washington, DC of both black and white leaders from Cambridge, hoping to negotiate an agreement that would allow progress and end the protests. Including Gloria Richardson, leader of the Cambridge Movement, they signed "The Treaty of Cambridge," adding an equal rights amendment to the city's charter, among other commitments. 

During 1963 the city desegregated its schools, library, hospital and other public facilities. Black activists pressed for economic development in the county and other actions to enable black people to improve their economic position. In 1964 they joined a voter registration and voting drive to elect a state representative to move for economic progress in the county. 

In late 1964, Richardson left Cambridge and moved to New York, where she married photographer Frank Dandridge, whom she had met when he was covering the protests in her town. In New York she met Jamil Abdullah Al-Amin, better known as H. Rap Brown, a black activist who supported violent resistance. He said, "Only through force could African-Americans win their rights". 

Civil unrest occurred in many cities during the summer of 1967. Although important civil rights legislation had been passed in 1964 and 1965, African Americans struggled locally with economics. 

H. Rap Brown was among the activists who went to Cambridge, where the local black community continued to press for improved conditions and opportunity. On the evening of July 24, 1967, a crowd of 20 to 30 black Cambridge citizens began marching toward Race Street, where a group of police officers met them and prevented their continuing. After telling the group to stop, Deputy Sheriff Wesley Burton shot twice with his shotgun without warning. One shot ricocheted off the ground, hitting H. Rap Brown in the head. Because of this, Brown was moved out of Cambridge. The adjutant general of Maryland said that Brown must have gotten hit later, during the full-fledged riot that broke out, but it did not start until after protesters learned that he had been wounded. Earlier in the evening Brown stood on top of a car in the city and said, “If Cambridge doesn't come around, Cambridge got to be burned down.”

Aftermath 
An hour after learning that Brown had been shot, black residents began to riot, and police officers and African Americans exchanged gunfire on the streets of Cambridge. A black elementary school on Pine Street, the social center of Dorchester County's black community, was burned down during the riot. It was considered a severe loss to the community. The all-white fire department did not respond to the fire. Reportedly they said, if the blacks had started it, they should finish it. Reportedly many black residents tried to put the fire out with buckets of water, but the fire was much too big. 

All of the structures on Pine Street burned, a total of 17 buildings destroyed. After these events, Governor Spiro Agnew attributed the damages to H. Rap Brown, because of his inflammatory speech. After inspecting the ruins of Pine Street, Governor Agnew said, “It shall now be the policy of the state to arrest any person inciting to riot, and to not allow that person to finish his vicious speech”. Agnew's response to the Cambridge riots is considered to have gained support among some whites for his political career. He was elected vice president in 1968 on the Republican ticket with Richard Nixon as president. He was later forced to resign because of corruption charges.

Accounts of the riots and conditions varied. City officials said Cambridge did not have a black ghetto, that its schools were among the finest in the nation (they had been segregated for decades), and that relationships among black and white residents were “excellent.” Reflecting fears of the time, especially by top-ranking FBI officials, the mainstream media reported ties between Black Power and communism. In response, the Black Action Federation conducted polls among residents where the rioting took place. They found that black residents of Cambridge said white racism and inequality were the underlying cause of the riots. It was not well-reported.

Many people of Cambridge, and the mayor of Baltimore, Thomas D'Alesandro III, alleged that the riots had been planned in advance. Black people said the events were a response to inequality. Police officers and white leaders called it a riot, attributing it to some organization. 

Two days later Brown was arrested and charged with inciting the riot. The government used him to set an example and instill fear into the social action movement so that it would not spread. There were conflicting stories between state officials and black activists as to what had actually occurred. Based on the reports from officials, public media thought that Brown was guilty and that his speech was a catalyst for the riot. Officials tried to make an example out of Brown and evade their own responsibility for events.

As noted, Governor Agnew was outraged about the riot. He had earlier had a positive reputation in the black community, but they resisted him later, after his actions following Cambridge events. He referred to Brown as a “professional agitator.” Agnew became increasingly critical of black civil rights leaders for what he said was their “failure” to stop rioting. In April 1968, following the assassination of Martin Luther King Jr in Memphis, Tennessee, Agnew invited fifty black civil rights leaders of Maryland to a conference. But there he essentially blamed black individuals for the rioting and looting in many cities that followed the murder of King. Many of the leaders left during Agnew’s speech. He lost most of his support in the black community.

See also
 1967 Newark riots in New Jersey
 1967 Plainfield riots in New Jersey
 1967 Detroit riot in Michigan
 Cambridge riot of 1963
 List of incidents of civil unrest in the United States

References

External links
"STATEMENT AT CONFERENCE WITH CIVIL RIGHTS AND COMMUNITY LEADERS, STATE OFFICE BUILDING, BALTIMORE, April 11, 1968", Executive Records, Governor Spiro T. Agnew, 1967-1969; Volume 83, Page 758

Cambridge riot
1967 riots
African-American history in Cambridge, Maryland
African-American riots in the United States
History of racism in Maryland
Riots and civil disorder in Maryland
July 1967 events in the United States
Long, hot summer of 1967